Patty Schnyder was the defending champion, but lost in the quarterfinals to Jelena Dokic.

Justine Henin-Hardenne won the title, defeating Dokic in the final, 6–0, 6–4. By winning the title, Henin-Hardenne replaced Kim Clijsters as the World No. 1 tennis player.

Seeds
The first four seeds received a bye into the second round.

Draw

Finals

Top half

Bottom half

Qualifying

Qualifying seeds

Qualifiers

Lucky loser
  Magüi Serna

Qualifying draw

First qualifier

Second qualifier

Third qualifier

Fourth qualifier

References

External links
 Official results archive (ITF)
 Official results archive (WTA)

2003 Singles
Swisscom Challenge - Singles